The 1914 Invercargill mayoral election was held on 29 April 1914 as part of that year's local elections. This was the final election for an annual term; beginning in 1915, terms would be biennial.

Incumbent mayor Duncan McFarlane was re-elected with an increased majority against former mayor William Ott.

Results
The following table gives the election results:

References

1914 elections in New Zealand
Mayoral elections in Invercargill